Don Nix (born September 27, 1941, Memphis, Tennessee, United States) is an American songwriter, composer, arranger, musician, and author. Although cited as being "one of the more obscure figures in Southern soul and rock", he is a key figure in several genres of Southern rock and soul, R&B, and the blues. He played "Memphis soul" sound.

Career
A native of Memphis, Tennessee, Nix came from a musical family (his brother, Larry Nix, became a mastering engineer for Stax Records and for the Ardent Studios in Memphis).  Don Nix began his career playing saxophone for the Mar-Keys, which also featured Steve Cropper, Duck Dunn and others.  The hit instrumental single "Last Night" (composed by the band as a whole) was the first of many successful hits to Nix's credit.  Without Nix, the Mar-Keys evolved into Booker T. & the M.G.'s.

As a producer, Nix worked with other artists and producers, such as Leon Russell of Shelter Records; Gary Lewis and the Playboys in Dick Clark's Caravan of Stars; George Harrison, of the Beatles; and John Mayall and the Bluesbreakers.  One notable achievement was his collaboration with Harrison, Russell, and  others in the production of the "Concert for Bangladesh". Nix agreed to organize a backing chorus group for the benefit concert at Madison Square Garden in 1971.

Throughout his career, Nix worked behind the scenes as producer, arranger, and musician and in other roles for artists including Lonnie Mack, Furry Lewis, Freddie King, Albert King, Delaney, Bonnie & Friends, Isaac Hayes, the Staple Singers, Jeff Beck, Brian May, Eric Clapton, and many others.  He wrote and produced albums for solo artists and for groups, such as Don Nix and the Alabama State Troupers, John Mayall and the Bluesbreakers, the Muscle Shoals Rhythm Section, and Larry Raspberry and the Highsteppers.

His song, "Going Down", originally released by the band Moloch on their eponymous album in 1969, has become a rock-and-roll standard, having been covered by Freddie King, Jeff Beck, Deep Purple, JJ Cale, Marc Ford, Chicken Shack, Bryan Ferry, Pearl Jam, Gov't Mule, The Rolling Stones, Sam Kinison, Stevie Ray Vaughan, Joe Satriani, the Who, Led Zeppelin, Sammy Hagar, Joe Bonamassa, Sturgill Simpson, Fraternity, Fun Lovin' Criminals and others.  Nix released a version of the song as a single for Elektra Records in 1972.  The songs "Black Cat Moan" and "Sweet Sweet Surrender" were covered on the 1973 album Beck, Bogert & Appice.  The Rolling Stones performed "Goin' Down" with John Mayer and Gary Clark, Jr. live on Pay-Per-View television on December 15, 2012, as part of the Stones' 50th Anniversary Tour.

In 2014, Alabama State Troupers Road Show was released as a CD.

Discography

Don Nix also produced Michael Chapman on Decca around 1974. The album was Savage Amusement recorded at Sawmills Studio in Cornwall and featured Keef Hartley (drums) and Rick Kemp (bass) plus other musicians and backing singers (Mutt and Stevie).

Books by Don Nix
 Road Stories and Recipes (1997), Schirmer Books/Simon & Schuster, New York. 
 Who's That with Don Nix? – A photojournal of Don Nix's personal experiences.
 Memphis Man: Living High, Laying Low (1997, 2015) Sartoris Literary Group, Jackson, Mississippi.

See also
Southern soul
Gospel music

References

External links
Jungleroom.com
Popmatters,com
Koti.mbnet.fi

1941 births
Living people
American male saxophonists
American session musicians
Musicians from Memphis, Tennessee
21st-century American saxophonists
21st-century American male musicians